Kahlil Cato (born 10 March 1977) was born in Bridgetown, Barbados, but competed for Saint Vincent and the Grenadines at the 1996 Summer Olympics in Atlanta, United States, he was a sprinter.

Cato competed in the 4x100 metres relay at the 1996 Summer Olympics with teammates Kambon Sampson, Joel Mascoll and Eswort Coombs, they ran in heat one and finished sixth out of eight and missed out qualifying for the next round by just over one second.

He later went on to attend Missouri Valley College and graduated in 2001 with a B.A. in Mass Communications.

References

1977 births
Living people
Saint Vincent and the Grenadines male sprinters
Olympic athletes of Saint Vincent and the Grenadines
Athletes (track and field) at the 1996 Summer Olympics
Sportspeople from Bridgetown